Tajuddin Muhammad Badruddin (January 27, 1861 – August 17, 1925), also known as Tajuddin Baba, was an Indian Sufi master who is considered as the Qutb. His  shrine is in Nagpur, India.

Birth
Tajuddin Baba was born in 1861 (1277 AH) to the family of Imam Hassan, being a tenth-generation descendant of the founder of the world Sufi Naqshbandi order, Baha-ud-Din Naqshband Bukhari, and a 22nd-generation descendant of the eleventh imam, Hasan al-Askari. Baba's forefathers had migrated from Mecca and settled down in Madras, India. His father was an employee in military.

Early life
Baba Tajuddin was orphaned at a young age and raised by his maternal grandmother and uncle Abdul Rahman. He attended a madrasah in Kamthi, Nagpur. There he met Abdulla Shah Naushahi .

Abdullah Shah Hussaini Qadri Shuttari Sahib who was a Majzoob Salik saint from Qadri Shuttari Sufi order commented (about Baba) to his teacher that "There is no need of teaching this boy, he is already a learned person." He also gave young Tajuddin Baba some dried fruits and nuts as his blessings for Baba, which is said to put the young boy into an ongoing spiritual trance-like state. Baba completed his education and studied Urdu, English, Arabic and Persian.

Names and titles
Shahenshah-E-Hafte AKlim ,Shahenshah-E-Wilayat, Tajul Auliya , Tajul Millat-e-Waddin , Taj Mohiyuddin Taj Moinuddin , Charag-E-Deen

References

Successor
Syed Gaus Mohd Yusuf Shah Taji

External Link
https://hazratbabatajuddinkhuddamdargahtrust.business.site" Hazrat baba tajuddin khuddam dargah trust

Indian Islamic religious leaders
People from Nagpur
Husaynids
Indian Sufi saints
1861 births
1925 deaths
19th-century Indian Muslims
19th-century Indian philosophers
19th-century Indian scholars
20th-century Indian Muslims
20th-century Indian philosophers